Pothos lancifolius is climbing plant species described by Hooker in the family Araceae.  No subspecies are listed in the Catalogue of Life.  This species has been recorded from Peninsular Malaysia and Vietnam - where it is called ráy leo lá rách or ráy leo hình bút lông.

References

External links

International Aroid Society: 12. Pothos lancifolius Hook.f.

Pothoideae
Flora of Vietnam
Flora of Peninsular Malaysia